The Boeing KC-97 Stratofreighter is a four-engined, piston-powered United States strategic tanker aircraft based on the Boeing C-97 Stratofreighter. It replaced the KB-29 and was succeeded by the Boeing KC-135 Stratotanker.

Design and development
The KC-97 Stratofreighter was an aerial refueling tanker variant of the C-97 Stratofreighter (which was itself based on the Boeing B-29 Superfortress), greatly modified with all the necessary tanks, plumbing, and a flying boom first developed for the KB-29 bomber. The cavernous upper deck was capable of accommodating oversize cargo accessed through a very large right-side door. In addition, transferable jet fuel was contained in tanks on the lower deck (G-L models). Both decks were heated and pressurized for high altitude operations. The boom operator lay prone, viewing operations through a window at the bottom of the tail, a configuration later used on  the KC-135

Note: Occasionally the KC-97 has been referred to as "Stratotanker". However, all reputable sources refer to the KC-97 as Stratofreighter, not -tanker. This includes both Boeing and the USAF themselves.

Operational history

The USAF began operating the KC-97 in 1950. It purchased a total of 811 KC-97s from Boeing, as opposed to only 74 of the C-97 cargo version. The KC-97 carried aviation gasoline for its own piston engines but it carried jet fuel for its refueling mission, this required an independent system for each type of fuel. However in an emergency, it was able to also offload its aviation gas to a receiver in a procedure universally known as a "save".

These tankers were vitally important to the world-wide Boeing B-47 Stratojet strategic operations. An example was the support of Arctic reconnaissance flights from Thule Air Base.

While it was an effective tanker, the KC-97's slow speed and low operational altitude complicated refueling operations with jet aircraft. B-52s typically lowered their flaps and rear landing gear to slow the aircraft enough to refuel from the KC-97. In addition, a typical B-52 refueling engagement profile would involve a descent that allowed the aircraft pair to maintain a higher airspeed (220–240 knots). In the early 1960s, the Tactical Air Command added General Electric J47 two twin- jet pods from retired KB-50 aerial tankers to produce the KC-97L. These jet pods increased the speed of the KC-97 (for short periods of time) and made it more compatible with jet fighter planes like the F-84, F-100, and F-101.

In 1956, the Strategic Air Command began phasing out its KC-97s in favor of the KC-135 Stratotanker. KC-97s continued flying with Tactical Air Command, the Air Force Reserve, and the Air National Guard. The rest of the KC-97s were retired completely in 1978, when the Texas Air National Guard and the Utah Air National Guard exchanged their KC-97Ls for the C-130 Hercules and the KC-135 Stratotanker, respectively.

One KC-97 airframe (AF Ser. No. 52-0828) was adapted into the Aero Spacelines Super Guppy, a transport plane designed to carry Apollo Program rocket stages from California to Florida. The aircraft carried the Saturn S-IVB stage, which served as the second stage of the Saturn IB, the third stage of the Saturn V, and the fourth stage for the never-built Nova rocket.

This modified KC-97, constructed in 1953, was eventually purchased by NASA in 1997. It is still in service supporting NASA, other Federal agencies, and Federal contractors. It is one of two KC-97s left still in flyable condition, the other being former KC-97G 52-2718, "Angel of Deliverance", currently flown by Berlin Airlift Historical Foundation as YC-97A 45-59595.

Variants

KC-97A Three C-97As were converted into aerial refueling tankers with rear loading door removed and a flight refueling boom added. After the design was proven, they were converted back into the standard C-97A.
KC-97E aerial refueling tankers with rear loading doors permanently closed, 60 built. Some were later converted into transports as the C-97E.
KC-97F 3800 hp R-4360-59B engines and minor changes, 159 built. Some were later converted into transport as the C-97F.
KC-97G Dual-role aerial refueling tankers/cargo transportation aircraft. KC-97G models carried underwing fuel tanks. 592 built.
EC-97G ELINT conversion of three KC-97Gs. 53-106 was operated by the Central Intelligence Agency for covert ELINT operations in the West Berlin Air Corridor.
C-97G 135 KC-97Gs converted to transports.
GKC-97G Five KC-97Gs were used as ground instruction airframes.
JKC-97G One aircraft was modified to test the underwing General Electric J47-GE-23 jet engines, and was later designated KC-97L.
HC-97G KC-97Gs converted for search and rescue operations, 22 converted.
KC-97H One KC-97F was experimentally converted into a hose-and-drogue refueling aircraft.
YC-97J two KC-97G conversion with four 4250 kW Pratt & Whitney YT34-P-5 turboprops, dropped in favour of the Boeing KC-135 Stratotanker.
C-97K 27 KC-97Gs converted to troop transports.
KC-97L 81 KC-97Gs modified with two J47 turbojet engines on underwing pylons.

Operators

 Israel Defense Forces

 Spanish Air Force

 United States Air Force

The following USAF wing organizations flew the various KC-97 models at some time during their existence:

Active duty

2d Bombardment Wing (Medium) – Hunter AFB, Georgia (1953–1963)
2d Air Refueling Squadron
9th Bombardment Wing (Medium) – Mountain Home AFB, Idaho (1954–1965)
9th Air Refueling Squadron
11th Air Refueling Wing – Altus AFB, Oklahoma (1957–1958)
96th Air Refueling Squadron
19th Bombardment Wing (Medium) – Homestead AFB, Florida (1955–1961)
19th Air Refueling Squadron
100th Air Refueling Squadron
303d Air Refueling Squadron
22d Bombardment Wing (Medium) – March AFB, California (1952–1962)
22d Air Refueling Squadron
22d Air Refueling Squadron – (relocated as a GSU to McChord AFB, Washington)
320th Air Refueling Squadron
26th Strategic Reconnaissance Wing (Medium) – Lockborne AFB, Ohio (1953–1955; 1956–1958)
26th Air Refueling Squadron
321st Air Refueling Squadron
28th Bombardment Wing (Heavy) – Ellsworth AFB, South Dakota (1962–1964)
97th Air Refueling Squadron – GSU Malmstrom AFB, Montana
40th Bombardment Wing (Medium) Schilling AFB, Kansas(1953–1960)
40th Air Refueling Squadron
42d Bombardment Wing (Heavy) – Limestone AFB, Maine (1955–1957)
42d Air Refueling Squadron
43d Bombardment Wing (Medium) – Davis-Monthan AFB, Arizona (1953–1960)
9th Air Refueling Squadron
43d Air Refueling Squadron
44th Bombardment Wing (Medium) – Lake Charles AFB, Louisiana (1953–1960)
44th Air Refueling Squadron
68th Bombardment Wing (Medium) – Lake Charles AFB, Louisiana (1953–1957)
68th Air Refueling Squadron
70th Strategic Reconnaissance Wing (Medium) – Little Rock AFB, Arkansas (1955–1961)
70th Air Refueling Squadron
90th Bombardment Wing (Medium) – Fairchild AFB, Washington (1955–1960)
90th Air Refueling Squadron
91st Bombardment Wing (Medium) – Glasgow AFB, Montana (1952–1957)
26th Air Refueling Squadron
68th Air Refueling Squadron
91st Air Refueling Squadron
100th Air Refueling Squadron
93d Bombardment Wing (Medium) – Castle AFB, California (1953–1957)
90th Air Refueling Squadron
93d Air Refueling Squadron
96th Bombardment Wing (Medium) – Altus AFB, Oklahoma (1954–1958)
11th Air Refueling Squadron
96th Air Refueling Squadron
321st Air Refueling Squadron
380th Air Refueling Squadron
97th Bombardment Wing (Medium) – Biggs AFB, Texas (1954–1957)
97th Air Refueling Squadron
98th Bombardment Wing (Medium) – Lincoln AFB, Nebraska (1954–1963)
98th Air Refueling Squadron
307th Air Refueling Squadron
100th Bombardment Wing (Medium) – Portsmouth AFB/Pease AFB, New Hampshire (1956–1966)
100th Air Refueling Squadron
509th Air Refueling Squadron
301st Bombardment Wing (Medium) – Barksdale AFB, Louisiana/Lockborne AFB, Ohio (1953–1963)
301st Air Refueling Squadron
303rd Bombardment Wing (Medium) – Davis-Monthan AFB, Arizona (1953–1956; 1960)
9th Air Refueling Squadron
43d Air Refueling Squadron
96th Air Refueling Squadron
303d Air Refueling Squadron
305th Bombardment Wing (Medium) – MacDill AFB, Florida (1951–1959)
305th Air Refueling Squadron
306th Bombardment Wing (Medium) – MacDill AFB, Florida (1951–1962)
306th Air Refueling Squadron
307th Bombardment Wing (Medium) – Lincoln AFB, Nebraska (1955–1960)
307th Air Refueling Squadron
308th Bombardment Wing (Medium) – Hunter AFB, Georgia (1953–1959)
303d Air Refueling Squadron
308th Air Refueling Squadron
310th Bombardment Wing (Medium) – Smoky Hill AFB/Schilling AFB, Kansas (1952–1963)
40th Air Refueling Squadron
310th Air Refueling Squadron
320th Bombardment Wing (Medium) – March AFB, California (1952–1960)
320th Air Refueling Squadron
321st Bombardment Wing (Medium) – Pinecastle AFB, Florida (1954–1956)
307th Air Refueling Squadron
321st Air Refueling Squadron
340th Bombardment Wing (Medium) – Whiteman AFB, Missouri (1954–1962)
34th Air Refueling Squadron
340th Air Refueling Squadron
341st Bombardment Wing (Medium) – Dyess AFB, Texas (1956–1960)
11th Air Refueling Squadron
376th Bombardment Wing (Medium) – Barksdale AFB, Louisiana/Lockborne AFB, Ohio (1953–1963)
91st Air Refueling Squadron
376th Air Refueling Squadron
379th Bombardment Wing – Homestead AFB, Florida (1956–1961)
19th Air Refueling Squadron
384th Air Refueling Wing (Heavy) – Little Rock AFB, Arkansas (1961–1963)
70th Air Refueling Squadron
397th Bombardment Wing (Heavy) – Dow AFB, Maine (1963–1964)
71st Air Refueling Squadron
341st Air Refueling Squadron
407th Strategic Fighter Wing – Great Falls AFB, Montana (1953–1957)
407th Air Refueling Squadron
497th Air Refueling Wing – Plattsburgh AFB, New York (1962–1964)
26th Air Refueling Squadron
380th Air Refueling Squadron
499th Air Refueling Wing – Westover AFB, Massachusetts (1963–1965)
11th Air Refueling Squadron – GSU Dover AFB, Delaware
19th Air Refueling Squadron – GSU Otis AFB, Massachusetts
99th Air Refueling Squadron  (operated KC-135 & EC-135 aircraft only)
303d Air Refueling Squadron – GSU Kindley AFB, Bermuda
305th Air Refueling Squadron- GSU McGuire AFB, New Jersey
384th Air Refueling Squadron – Westover AFB, Massachusetts (1963–1965)
500th Air Refueling Wing – Selfridge AFB, Michigan (1963–1964)
44th Air Refueling Squadron
307th Air Refueling Squadron
509th Bombardment Wing (Heavy) – Walker AFB, New Mexico/Pease AFB, New Hampshire (1954–1965)
509th Air Refueling Squadron
4397th Air Refueling Training Wing – Randolph AFB, Texas (1958–1963)
 4397th Combat Crew Training Squadron
4050th Air Refueling Wing – Westover AFB, Massachusetts (1955–1962)
11th Air Refueling Squadron – GSU Dover AFB, Delaware
19th Air Refueling Squadron – GSU Otis AFB, Massachusetts
26th Air Refueling Squadron – Westover AFB, Massachusetts
303d Air Refueling Squadron – GSU Kindley AFB, Bermuda
305th Air Refueling Squadron- GSU McGuire AFB, New Jersey
384th Air Refueling Squadron – Westover AFB, Massachusetts (1963–1965)
4060th Air Refueling Wing – Dow AFB, Maine/Plattsburgh AFB, New York (1955–1962)
4108th Air Refueling Wing – Plattsburgh AFB, New York (1961–1965)
4045th Air Refueling Wing – Selfridge AFB, Michigan
4061st Air Refueling Wing – Malmstrom AFB, Montana (1957–1961)
 407th Air Refueling Squadron
4081st Strategic Wing – Ernest Harmon AFB, Newfoundland, Canada (1960–1966)
376th Air Refueling Squadron

Air National Guard

106th Air Refueling Group – NAS New York/Floyd Bennett Field, then Suffolk County Airport, New York (1962–1972)
102d Air Refueling Squadron
126th Air Refueling Wing – O'Hare International Airport, Illinois (1953–1976)
108th Air Refueling Squadron
128th Air Refueling Wing – General Mitchell Air National Guard Base, Wisconsin (1962–1977)
126th Air Refueling Squadron
134th Air Refueling Wing – McGhee Tyson Air National Guard Base, Tennessee (1964–1977)
151st Air Refueling Squadron
146th Air Transport Wing- Van Nuys, California  (1962–1967)
115th Air Refueling Squadron
136th Air Refueling Wing – NAS Dallas, Texas (1965–1978)
181st Air Refueling Squadron
139th Air Refueling Group – Rosecrans Air National Guard Base, Missouri (1969–1976)
180th Air Refueling Squadron
151st Air Refueling Group – Salt Lake City Air National Guard Base, Utah (1972–1978)
191st Air Refueling Squadron
160th Air Refueling Group – Lockborne AFB, Ohio (1965–1975)
145th Air Refueling Squadron
161st Air Refueling Group – Goldwater Air National Guard Base, Arizona (1972–1977)
197th Air Refueling Squadron
171st Air Refueling Wing – Pittsburgh IAP Air Reserve Station, Pennsylvania (1972–1977)
147th Air Refueling Squadron

Accidents and incidents
27 June 1954KC-97G AF Ser. No. 52-2654 which departed from Altus Air Force Base, Oklahoma, encountered poor weather at its destination, March Air Force Base in California, and attempted to divert to Norton Air Force Base, but crashed into Box Springs Mountain north of Riverside, California, killing all 14 people on board.
4 May 1955USAF KC-97G 53-0110 was flying in formation when it crashed into the Atlantic 90 mi off Iceland due to loss of control caused by an engine fire, killing all nine on board.
6 July 1956USAF KC-97E 51-0220 crashed in a wooded area 45 mile northeast of Goose Bay, Canada after reporting an engine fire, killing all six on board.
22 January 1957a KC-97G AF Ser. No. 53-0222 from Griffiss Air Force Base, New York, crashed in the foothills of the Adirondack Mountains, killing its crew of seven.
9 May 1957KC-97F AF Ser. No. 51-0258 en route from Sidi Slimane Air Base, Morocco, to Lajes AB, Azores, ditched in the Atlantic 550 km (343.8 mls) SE of the Azores Islands following a double engine failure. All seven crew survived. The airplane floated for ten days before being sunk by the battleship USS Wisconsin.
18 July 1957KC-97G AF Ser. No. 52-2737 from the 380th Air Refueling Squadron with a crew of eight, exploded and crashed into Lake Champlain at 2128 hrs., when two of the four engines failed three minutes after take-off from Plattsburgh AFB, New York. There were three survivors.
29 October 1957KC-97G AF Ser. No. 52-2711 of the 509th Bomb Wing, out of Walker AFB, New Mexico, crashed 35 miles north of Flagstaff, Arizona, while on a nine-hour low-level survey flight to determine minimum altitude restrictions for B-47 training routes. The aircraft was seen over Gray Mountain, Arizona, at altitude of 60 feet shortly after 0830 hrs., and then heard striking a cloud-shrouded cliff face, killing 16 crew and strewing wreckage for 200 yards along mountainside.
22 July 1959KC-97 AF Ser. No. 52-2703 of Pease Air Force Base crashed near Andover, New Hampshire, while on a nighttime training mission; all seven crewmen were killed.
14 December 1959KC-97G AF Ser. No. 53-0231 of the 384th Air Refueling Squadron, out of Westover AFB, Massachusetts, collided with a B-52 during a refueling mission at an altitude of ~15,000 feet. The aircraft lost the whole left horizontal stabilizer and elevator, the rudder, and the upper quarter of the vertical stabilizer. The crew made a no-flap, electrical power off landing at night at Dow AFB, Maine; seven crew okay. "Spokesmen at Dow Air Force, Bangor, said the B52 [sic] apparently 'crowded too close' and rammed a fuel boom into the tail of a four-engined KC95 [sic] tanker plane."   Aircraft stricken as beyond economical repair. Two crew on the B-52 ejected, parachuted safely, and were recovered by helicopters in a snow-covered wilderness area. The bomber and remaining eight crew safely landed at Westover AFB.
30 March 1960KC-97 AF Ser. No. 51-0363 (Manufacturer's Serial Number 16430) ditched and sank off Cape Canaveral. This particular aircraft was lost due to engine damage caused by hail. The crash resulted in 3 fatalities of the 14 crew. The wreck of the aircraft was discovered June 6, 2015, in 365 feet of water by divers.
15 April 1960KC-97G AF Ser. No. 52-0919 of the 307th Air Refueling Squadron, 307th Bomb Wing, crashed on take-off from Lincoln AFB, Nebraska, after the undercarriage collapsed. All 24 on board survived, with two airmen suffering leg fractures and five others with minor cuts and burns.
27 June 1960KC-97G AF Ser. No. 52-2728 of the 380th Air Refueling Squadron, Plattsburgh AFB, New York, suffered failure of lubrication on an engine impeller shaft during an evening four-hour training mission to refuel a Boeing B-47 Stratojet. During rendezvous at 15,500 feet, the tanker's number one (port outer) powerplant caught fire. As the bomber moved away from the burning tanker, the crew tried unsuccessfully to put out the blaze. The plane went into a spin as the wing failed outboard of the engine; the aircraft crashed on Jonathan Smith Mountain, a hill east of Puzzle Mountain in Newry, Maine. The flash of the fire was seen from as far away as Lewiston and Bridgton. All five crew were killed. Wreckage covering five acres was still there as of 2010.
28 February 1961KC-97 AF Ser. No. UNKNOWN of Selfridge Air Force Base, MI. Aircraft crashed shortly after take-off due to engine failure. All five crew members were killed. The aircraft struck houses and an ornamental windmill that was a landmark along Gratiot Rd. (M-25), just north of the base. The attached article incorrectly identifies Selfridge AFB as Selfridge ANGB. Selfridge was not transferred to the Air National Guard until 1 July, 1971. https://www.baaa-acro.com/crash/crash-boeing-kc-97-stratotanker-selfridge-afb-5-killed
 5 November 1964KC-97 AF Ser. No. unknown of Pease Air Force Base crashed on takeoff; all five crewmen were killed.
19 December 1964 USAF KC-97G 52-907 ran off the runway at Ernest Harmon AFB after the pilot landed too far down the runway, killing all five on board. The pilot attempted to abort the landing, but the aircraft struck approach lights and crashed into a pond.
19 January 1969 Wisconsin Air National Guard KC-97L 52-0904 crashed short of the runway at General Mitchell Airport, killing four of 11 on board.
17 September 1971KC-97G IAF Serial 4X-FPR/033 of the Israeli Air Force, was shot down by Egyptian missiles over Suez, Egypt; seven of eight-man crew were killed.

Surviving aircraft

Airworthy

KC-97G 
52-918 - privately owned in Riverton, Wyoming.
52-2698 - privately owned in Greybull, Wyoming.

KC-97L 
52-2695 - privately owned in Greybull, Wyoming.
52-2761 - privately owned in Greybull, Wyoming.
53-208 - privately owned in Riverton, Wyoming.
53-265 - privately owned in Riverton, Wyoming.
53-350 - privately owned in Riverton, Wyoming.

On display

KC-97G 
52-895 – Rogue Valley International-Medford Airport in Central Point, Oregon.
52-905 – Wisconsin National Guard Museum at Volk Field Air National Guard Base in Camp Douglas, Wisconsin.
52-2604 - Cleveland I-X Center grounds in Cleveland Ohio.
52-2624 – Florence Air & Missile Museum, Florence Regional Airport, Florence, South Carolina, which is now closed.  Following museum closure, parts were used complete the KC-97, AF Ser. No. 53-0335, on display at the Carolinas Aviation Museum. 
52-2630 – National Museum of the United States Air Force at Wright-Patterson Air Force Base near Dayton, Ohio.
52-2697 – Grissom Air Museum at Grissom Air Reserve Base (former Grissom AFB) in Peru, Indiana.
52-2736 – Israeli Air Force Museum adjacent to Beersheba, Israel.
53-151 – Pima Air and Space Museum adjacent to Davis-Monthan Air Force Base in Tucson, Arizona.
53-189 (Spanish Serial Number TK1-3) – Museo del Aire (Spain) at Cuatro Vientos Airport in Madrid, Spain. Former USAF aircraft.
53-198 – Strategic Air Command & Aerospace Museum near Ashland, Nebraska.
53-218 – Minnesota Air National Guard Museum, St. Paul, Minnesota. Displayed in C-97G configuration.
53-230 – Air Mobility Command Museum at Dover Air Force Base, Delaware.
53-240 – Barksdale Global Power Museum at Barksdale Air Force Base, Louisiana.
53-272 - Milestones of Flight Museum, General William J. Fox Airfield, Lancaster, California, which is now closed.
53-282 – Dyess Linear Air Park at Dyess Air Force Base in Abilene, Texas.
53-283 – The Airplane Restaurant adjacent to Peterson Air Force Base and Colorado Springs Municipal Airport in Colorado Springs, Colorado.
53-298 – Museum of Aviation at Robins Air Force Base in Georgia.
53-327 – Whiteman Air Force Base in Knob Noster, Missouri.
53-335 – Carolinas Aviation Museum, north of Charlotte Air National Guard Base at Charlotte-Douglas International Airport in Charlotte, North Carolina.  The museum is closed with a planned re-opening in 2022.
53-354 – Castle Air Museum at the former Castle Air Force Base in Atwater, California.
53-360 – Malmstrom Museum, Malmstrom Air Force Base, Montana. Displayed as 52-2638.
53-363 – March Field Air Museum at March Air Reserve Base (former March AFB) in Riverside, California.

In popular culture
The KC-97 Stratofreighter is shown in both its cargo and tanker tasks in the 1955 film Strategic Air Command, refueling a B-47 in flight, and in the 1957 film Bombers B-52, refueling B-52s.

Specifications (KC-97L)

See also

References

Citations

Bibliography 

 Bach, Martin: Boeing 367 Stratofreighter, Boeing 377 Stratocruiser, Aero Spacelines Guppies. NARA Verlag, Allershausen 1996, . 
 Bowers, Peter M.: Boeing Aircraft since 1916. Putnam Aeronautical Books, London 1989, . 
 Swanborough, Gordon and Bowers, Peter M.: United States Military Aircraft since 1909. Putnam Aeronautical Books, London 1989, .

External links

 KC-97 page at the National Museum of the United States Air Force
 Airworthy KC-97 Angel of Deliverance

KC-097
KC-97 Stratotanker
Four-engined tractor aircraft
Low-wing aircraft
Aircraft with auxiliary jet engines
Air refueling
Stratotanker
Four-engined piston aircraft